Michiel Steven Daniel Horn  (born 1939) is a Canadian historian who serves as a professor emeritus at Glendon College, York University.

Life and career
Horn was born on September 3, 1939, in Baarn, Netherlands. His family migrated to Canada from the Netherlands in 1952, settling in Victoria, British Columbia. He graduated from Victoria High School in 1956.

Horn holds a Bachelor of Arts degree from the University of British Columbia, and Master of Arts and Doctor of Philosophy degrees from the University of Toronto. He is currently a professor emeritus of history and university historian at Glendon College, York University, in Toronto, where he has worked since 1968.

Horn has been married to Cornelia Maria Schuh, a lawyer and civil servant with the Ontario provincial government, since December 29, 1984. They have two sons, Daniel and Patrick.

In 2002, Horn was inducted into the Royal Society of Canada in Academy II (Social Sciences).

Bibliography

See also 
 F. R. Scott

Notes

References

 Elizabeth Lumley (Editor), Canadian Who's Who 2006, University of Toronto Press, 2006,   
 Michiel Horn, Becoming Canadian: Memoirs of an Invisible Immigrant, University of Toronto Press, 1997,

External links
Michiel Horn, Glendon College, York University, Faculty
Alumni Association, University of Victoria

1939 births
Living people
20th-century Canadian historians
Canadian male non-fiction writers
Dutch emigrants to Canada
Fellows of the Royal Society of Canada
People from Baarn
University of Toronto alumni
Academic staff of York University
University of British Columbia alumni
Academic staff of Glendon College